Yadavendra Dutt Dubey (1918–1999)  was the Maharaja of Jaunpur since 1956. He had been a member of the Hindu nationalist organisation Rashtriya Swayamsevak Sangh since 1942 and became its  (director) for the Varanasi division. He was elected to the 6th and 9th Lok Sabha from Jaunpur on a Bharatiya Jan Sangh ticket. He was a member of Uttar Pradesh Legislative Assembly for 17 years and served as its leader of opposition from 1962 to 1964.

References

1918 births
1999 deaths
People from Jaunpur, Uttar Pradesh
Bharatiya Janata Party politicians from Uttar Pradesh
Lok Sabha members from Uttar Pradesh
India MPs 1977–1979
India MPs 1989–1991
Leaders of the Opposition in the Uttar Pradesh Legislative Assembly
Bharatiya Jana Sangh politicians
Uttar Pradesh MLAs 1962–1967